Sheikh Hamad bin Jassim bin Jaber bin Mohammed bin Thani Al Thani (born 1959), also known informally by his initials HBJ, is a Qatari politician. He was the Prime Minister of Qatar from 3 April 2007 to 26 June 2013, and foreign minister from 11 January 1992 to 26 June 2013.

Early life
Hamad was born in Doha, Qatar, in 1959. He is the fifth son of Jassim bin Jaber Al Thani. Through his father, he is the grandson of Jaber bin Mohammed Al Thani. Jaber was a younger brother of Jassim bin Mohammed Al Thani, the founding father of modern Qatar.

Career

Between 1982 and 1989, Hamad was the director of the office of the minister of municipal affairs and agriculture. In July 1989, he was appointed minister of municipal affairs and agriculture and in May 1990, he was appointed deputy minister of electricity and water along with his post as minister of municipal affairs and agriculture, where he supervised several successful projects and developed the agriculture sector.

On 1 September 1992, Hamad was appointed as foreign minister of Qatar by the 8th Emir. He was retained in his post when the Emir's son, Hamad bin Khalifa Al Thani came to power in a coup in 1995. Hamad played an important role in the overthrow of the 8th Emir. On 16 September 2003, Hamad was appointed first deputy prime minister while retaining his position of minister of foreign affairs. On 2 April 2007, he was appointed as prime minister, following the resignation of Abdullah bin Khalifa Al Thani; Hamad also continued to serve as foreign minister. HBJ had vast foreign policy goals for Qatar during his tenure.

Hamad was reported to have had strong connections with the US government. He serves on the International Advisory Council of the Brookings Institution and chairs the International Advisory Council of the Brookings Doha Center. He has stakes in many strong businesses such as Qatar Airways and the Foreign Investment Company, Qatari Diar Real Estate Investment Company, The Pearl Island and Harrods. He is a partner in Project Grande (Guernsey), the developer of One Hyde Park in London, United Kingdom.

Additionally, Hamad held several other key positions including member of the supreme defense council, which was established in 1996; head of Qatar's permanent committee for the support of al Quds, which was formed in 1998; member of the permanent constitution committee, formed in 1999; member of the ruling family council, which was established in 2000; and member of the supreme council for the investment of the reserves of the state, which was established in 2000.

Hamad bin Khalifa al-Thani, ruling Emir of Qatar from 1995 to 2013, was the first Arab politician received by Nicolas Sarkozy after the latter's election to the French presidency in May 2007. A May 2008 diplomatic cable sent by then U.S. chargé d'affaires in Doha, alluded to a dispute between HBJ and the Qatari intelligence officials over a Qatari senior bank official imprisoned for 6 months over his role in funding Khalid Sheikh Mohammed (KSM), the al-Qaeda mastermind of September 11. The senior bank official was Khalifa Muhammad Turki al-Subaiy who financed KSM while working at Qatar Central Bank. The French government made of Qatar under Hamad's guidance a strategic partner, and the list of partnerships between the two states includes Total, EADS, Technip, Air Liquide, Vinci SA, GDF Suez, and Areva. France was, under the Hamad government, the primary arms supplier to the Emirate. In February 2009, under the Sarkozy government, France accorded special beyond-OCDE investment privileges to Qatar, its ruling family and its State-Owned Enterprises; one example of the privileges is capital gains exemptions in France.

The US embassy to Doha claimed, in a cable disclosed in December 2010 by WikiLeaks, that "Sheikh Hamad (HBJ) told then US senator John Kerry that he had proposed a bargain with the Egyptian president, Hosni Mubarak, which involved stopping broadcasts in Egypt in exchange for a change in Cairo's position on Israel-Palestinian negotiations, and that 'we would stop al-Jazeera for a year' if Mubarak agreed in that span of time to deliver a lasting settlement for the Palestinians."

On 25 June 2013, Hamad bin Khalifa Al Thani abdicated as Emir of Qatar, and on the next day, 26 June, Hamad resigned from office. Some have questioned whether this was because the new emir pulled him from his post after realizing how much power HBJ had amassed. He was replaced by Abdullah bin Nasser bin Khalifa Al Thani as prime minister and by Khalid bin Mohammad Al Attiyah as foreign minister. On 3 July, Hamad was also relieved from the post of deputy head of the Qatar Investment Authority (QIA).

It was under HBJ that Qatar began assisting rebels in Syria by supplying them with arms.  This move brought criticism upon Qatar, as some questioned whether these arms ultimately ended up in the wrong hands.

In June 2021, High Court of Justice in London issued a claim, according to which Hamad bin Jassim's private office was at the heart of clandestine routes by which money was transferred to an Al-Qaeda affiliate in Syria, the Al-Nusra Front.

In March 2022 Hamad bin Jassim said to a Qatari television that the Military Operations Command in Jordan and Turkey have spent $2 trillion to remove Syria's President Bashar al-Assad.

Mediation efforts

Hamad has worked actively to settle political conflicts in both Africa and the Middle East over the last 20 years. 

In 2010, he led the mediation efforts that resulted in the signing of a peace agreement between Djibouti and Eritrea to settle their border dispute and thereby paving the way for broader peace talks to end the six-year conflict in the region. According to the negotiated peace declaration, the two parties pledged to give peaceful means a “strategic priority to settle the conflict in Darfur”, and to take the required measures to create “an opportune environment to achieve a lasting settlement”, including the halting of “inconvenience to the displaced and ensuring the flow of relief aid”. The parties furthermore committed themselves to prisoners swap and the release of those who were detained due to the dispute.

In 2009, he assisted in the settlement agreement between Sudan and Chad. The civil war in Chad began in December 2005. On February 8, 2006 the Tripoli Agreement was signed, which temporarily stopped the fighting. However, hostilities resumed after two months, leading to several new agreement attempts and a final settlement between the two parties in 2009.

In 2009, Hamad participated in brokering a peace agreement to end the conflict in Darfur ("The Goodwill and Confidence Building Pact”) between the government of Sudan and Justice and Equality Movement. The pact also opened up to the rest of factions in Darfur.

He participated in mediation of ceasefire in Yemen between the Government of Yemen and the Houthi Movement in 2007. In 2010, the two parties agreed to activate the agreement after confrontations threatening the ceasefire. The mediation ended a six-year war between the two sides.

In 2007, Hamad helped organize the Lebanese national dialogue and the peace agreement between various Lebanese political groups to end the worst internal fighting in Lebanon since the civil war of 1975–1990. In an attempt to resolve a broader political showdown that had paralyzed the country for 18 months, Hamad summoned the Lebanese government and Hezbollah-led opposition to Qatar for talks. He declared an agreement sponsored by the Arab League to deal with the Lebanese crisis. In the agreement the parties pledged, “to refrain from returning to the use of weapons or violence to realize political gains." The Lebanese government furthermore committed itself to introduce a new electoral law designed to provide better representation in the country's sectarian system of power sharing.

Hamad was instrumental in creating the peace settlement between Sudan and Eritrea in 1998. The un-demarcated border with Sudan had posed a problem for Eritrean external relations for most of the nation's existence. He negotiated a peace settlement between Sudan and Eritrea. After the agreement was signed, relations somewhat normalized.

In 1996, he worked to settle a brief war between Eritrea and Yemen over the Hanish Islands. As part of the agreement to cease hostilities the two nations agreed, through the negotiating effort of Hamad, to refer the issue to the Permanent Court of Arbitration at The Hague in 1998. Yemen was granted full ownership of the larger islands while Eritrea was awarded the peripheral islands to the southwest of the larger islands. Since then relations between the two governments have remained relatively normal.

Hamad facilitated the agreement that led to a unity constitution in Yemen in May 1990, ratified by the populace in May 1991. It affirmed Yemen's commitment to free elections, a multiparty political system, the right to own private property, equality under the law, and respect of basic human rights. Parliamentary elections were held on 27 April 1993.

Hamad also has been involved in ongoing efforts between Fatah and Hamas to achieve Palestinian reconciliation to activate the peace process with Israel.

Of other humanitarian initiatives, he has facilitated the release of prisoners, including the five Lebanese prisoners in Eritrea. He supported the effort to release Mr. Nawaz Sharif, the former Prime Minister of Pakistan from jail, and was instrumental in freeing the Bulgarian nurses in Libya from prison. He has opened Qatar to political refugees in the Muslim and Arab worlds.  During the Bosnian conflict of the 1990s, he secured large quantities of food, medicine and other items to the Bosnian population.

In November 2010 he launched the Humanitarian Appeal 2011 in Doha, together with the United Nations Office for the Coordination of Humanitarian Affairs (OCHA) and the United Nations High Commissioner for Refugees (UNHCR). The initiative was set to help improve the living conditions for millions of people affected by humanitarian crises around the world. The initiative was attended by 85 representatives of 85 representatives from EU Member States, the European Commission, the Council of the European Union,
beneficiary countries, UN and NGOs.

Legal issues

BAE Systems 
Following courting by Michael Portillo, Qatar entered into an arms deal worth £500 million with BAE Systems. £7 million was transferred into two trusts in Jersey of which Hamad was named as a beneficiary. In an attempt to prevent money laundering, the funds were frozen from 16 July 2000 by the Jersey Financial Services Commission, who then began a court case and investigation. Hamad paid the Jersey authorities £6 million as a "voluntary reparation" as "the structures put in place by his advisers may have contributed to the cost and complexity of the inquiry." The case was then dropped by the Jersey authorities.

Heritage Oil 
In June 2014, HBJ acquired 80% of Heritage Oil, which was listed as a London exploration and production company. At the same time, he was listed as a “Counsellor” at the Qatari embassy and as such was privileged to legal immunity under the 1961 Vienna Convention. Article 42 of this convention states that “a diplomat shall not in the receiving State practise for personal profit any professional or commercial activity” thereby disallowing the acquisition in which HBJ engaged. The stake, valued at £924 million and dated April 30, 2014, transferred to a “wholly owned subsidiary” of Al-Mirqab Capital, an investment company privately owned by HBJ and his family. HBJ's lawyers maintain that the fact that the company was listed in London is not sufficient evidence to determine that Article 42 had been violated.

Paradise Papers 
In November 2017 an investigation conducted by the International Consortium of Investigative Journalism cited his name in the list of politicians named in the Paradise Papers.

Positions and opinions 
At a 2015 speech at the Chatham House, a London-based think tank, HBJ warned the Israelis, reminding them that they are surrounded by 400 million Arabs, saying “you have the upper hand now but you are surrounded. Accept the 1967 boundaries, the two state solution. Your superiority will not last forever. Solve (the Palestinian question) and terrorism is defused.”

Business and wealth
Al Thani is one of the richest people in the world, having overseen Qatar's $230 billion sovereign wealth fund until 2013. He has been named "the man who bought London" by British tabloids; his holdings in London include the Shard, Harrods, and the InterContinental London Park Lane. He also owns football club Paris Saint-Germain.

It was reported that Hamad bin Jassim bin Jaber Al Thani bought Banque Internationale à Luxembourg and KBL European Private Bankers via Precision Capital, making one of the largest banking groups in Luxembourg.

According to the U.S. Securities and Exchange Commission filing, he also owns 3.05% shares of the Deutsche Bank, via Paramount Services Holdings Limited; his relative, HH Hamad bin Khalifa Al Thani (former emir/ruler of Qatar), via another company Supreme Universal Holdings, owns 3.05% of the shares. Part of Hamad bin Khalifa's stake was sold by Hamad bin Jassim bin Jaber.

In May 2015, Hamad purchased Picasso's Les Femmes d'Alger (Version O)  for $179.4 million including fees, a record price for a painting at auction. He also owns a super-yacht, the Al Mirqab, worth $300 million.

In 2021, the Sunday Times Rich List estimated his net worth at £2 billion.

Donations
In June 2022, The Times reported that between 2011 and 2015 Prince Charles accepted €3 million in cash from Hamad. The funds were said to be in the form of €500 notes, handed over in person in three tranches, in a suitcase, holdall and Fortnum & Mason carrier bags. Charles' meetings with Hamad did not appear in the Court Circular. Coutts collected the cash and each payment was deposited into the accounts of The Prince of Wales's Charitable Fund. A Clarence House spokesperson stated that the appropriate covenants were carried out, and it was the "donor's choice" to make the donations in cash, after which the trustees "discussed the governance and donor relationship" and the auditors "signed off on the donation after a specific enquiry during the audit". There is no evidence that the payments were illegal or that it was not intended for the money to go to the charity. The Charity Commission for England and Wales announced they would review the information and determine if "there is any role for the Commission in this matter".

Honours

 Knight Grand Cross of the Order of Merit of the Italian Republic (16 November 2010, Italy).
Honorary Doctorate in Humane Letters from the Lebanese American University (28 April 2010, Lebanon).

Personal life
In 1982, Hamad married Sheikha Jawaher bint Fahad Al Thani. He subsequently married Sheikha Noor Al Subaie, the daughter of the former minister of education, in 1996 as his second wife.

He has 15 children, seven sons and eight daughters.

 Sheikh Jaber bin Hamad Al Thani
 Sheikh Jassim bin Hamad bin Jassim bin Jaber Al Thani
 Sheikh Mohammed bin Hamad Al Thani
 Sheikh Fahad bin Hamad Al Thani
 Sheikh Tamim bin Hamad Al Thani
 Sheikh Falah bin Hamad Al Thani
 Sheikh Abdulaziz bin Hamad Al Thani
 Sheikha Maryam bint Hamad Al Thani
 Sheikha Al Anoud bint Hamad Al Thani
 Sheikha Noor bint Hamad Al Thani
 Sheikha Lamya bint Hamad Al Thani
 Sheikha Sharifa bint Hamad Al Thani
 Sheikha May bint Hamad Al Thani
 Sheikha Hayfa bint Hamad Al Thani
 Sheikha Alya bint Hamad Al Thani

References

External links

Thani, Hamad Bin Jassim Bin Jabor
Living people
Hamad bin Jassim bin Jaber Al Thani
Foreign ministers of Qatar
Prime Ministers of Qatar
Qatari billionaires
Qatari Muslims
Qatari art collectors
People named in the Panama Papers
People named in the Paradise Papers